Golman Pierre (born 21 February 1971) is a Haitian retired footballer who played as a striker.

Club career
Pierre was born in Dessalines. He played his entire career in the Ligue Haïtienne for FICA (Football Inter Club Association), located in Cap-Haïtien, where he was one of the team's highest scorers. He totaled 109 goals for the club.

In 1998, he won his first national championship. The following season, he was the top goalscorer of the league with 19 goals. He also topped the goalscoring charts with 24 goals in FICA's 2001 championship winning season.

He retired in 2005 when FICA did not hold its position in the elite of Haitian football for the first time in his career when regulated to the Second Division. Late during his career, he was linked to many allegations of transfer to European-based teams but ultimately remained with FICA, where he won two national championships in a ten-year span.

International career
Pierre made his national team debut in 1996 and was a Haiti squad member for the 2002 CONCACAF Gold Cup. He played in 11 FIFA World Cup qualification matches between 1996 and 2000 in which he scored an 15 goals, 12 of them in the 2002 qualifiers.

References

External links
 Player profile - HaitiFoot.com
 
 World Cup qualification games - FIFA.com

1971 births
Living people
People from Artibonite (department)
Haitian footballers
Association football forwards
Haiti international footballers
2002 CONCACAF Gold Cup players
Ligue Haïtienne players
Football Inter Club Association players